John Stewart (dates unknown) was an English amateur cricketer who made 2 known appearances in first-class cricket matches from 1792 to 1797.

Career
He was mainly associated with Hampshire.

References

External sources
 CricketArchive record

English cricketers
English cricketers of 1787 to 1825
Hampshire cricketers
Year of birth unknown
Year of death unknown